Wu Bangguo (born 12 July 1941) is a retired high-ranking politician in the People's Republic of China. He was the Chairman and Chinese Communist Party Committee Secretary of the Standing Committee of the National People's Congress from 2003 to 2013, a position that made him Chinese Speaker. He ranked second in official rankings of state and party leaders of China.

Wu is an electrical engineer by profession, and rose to national fame through regional work as the party chief of Shanghai and as Vice-Premier.

Early life
Wu was born in Pingba, Guizhou, with ancestral roots in Feidong, Anhui. He entered Tsinghua University in 1960, majoring in electron tube engineering at the Department of Radio Electronics, where he graduated in 1967. He subsequently was employed as a worker and technician at Shanghai's No. 3 Electronic Tube Factory, and then deputy chief and chief of the technical section from 1976 to 1978. He would eventually go on to lead the factory as its party secretary. In 1978 he was assigned to become the deputy manager of Shanghai Electronic Elements Company, and between 1979 and 1981 the deputy manager of Shanghai Electron Tube Company. Between 1981 and 1983 he worked as the deputy secretary of Shanghai Meters, Instruments and Telecommunications Bureau.

Political life
Wu's work in electronics companies earned him a tenure in the city's upper echelons of power. He became part of the Standing Committee of the Shanghai party committee in 1983, effectively becoming part of Shanghai's political inner circle, and was put in charge of work related to science and technology. Between 1985 and 1991, Wu was elevated to Deputy secretary of the CPC Shanghai Municipal Committee, and subsequently as CCP party secretary of Shanghai, the city's first-in-charge.

As Shanghai's political and economic stature grew due to economic reforms, Wu gained a seat on the Politburo of the Chinese Communist Party, China's ruling council, in 1992. He was subsequently elevated to Vice-Premier of the State Council in 1995 under Premier Li Peng, where he served in a portfolio dealing with industry and reforming state-owned enterprises, ranking third. He continued as Vice-Premier under Zhu Rongji, and served as the role until the 2003 National People's Congress.

At the 16th Party Congress in November 2002, Wu entered the highest power elite in the country, ranking second in the Politburo Standing Committee of the Chinese Communist Party, only under then general secretary Hu Jintao. Since 2003, he has served as the Chairman of the Standing Committee of the National People's Congress of the People's Republic of China, a position which is roughly equivalent to that of a Speaker of a legislative assembly. At the 11th National People's Congress, he was re-elected as Chairman of the NPC Standing Committee on 15 March 2008. In his capacity as NPCSC chair, Wu delivers an annual address each year at the National People's Congress sessions in March. These speeches have always noted that China will not adopt multiparty democracy, separation of powers, or a federal system.

During a speech about the Basic Law of Hong Kong in the territory in June 2007, Wu warned that Hong Kong will only have as much authority as granted from Beijing, and that the Special Administrative Region's government is an executive-led model and should not blindly follow Western systems. He also stated that the Central Government supported Hong Kong's development of democracy, so long as it is within the boundaries of the Hong Kong Basic Law. Although the remarks were left open to interpretation, they generated significant controversy in Hong Kong, with pro-democracy politicians calling it a challenge on the autonomy of the territory.

On 16 July 2012, Wu attended the launch ceremony of Shenzhou 9 crewed spacecraft.

See also
 Shanghai clique

References

External links
Wu Bangguo biography at China Vitae (online database of Chinese officials)

1941 births
Living people
Chairmen of the Standing Committee of the National People's Congress
Chinese electrical engineers
Chinese Communist Party politicians from Anhui
Delegates to the 16th National Congress of the Chinese Communist Party
Delegates to the 17th National Congress of the Chinese Communist Party
Delegates to the 7th National People's Congress
Delegates to the 8th National People's Congress
Delegates to the 9th National People's Congress
Delegates to the 10th National People's Congress
Delegates to the 11th National People's Congress
Members of the 14th Politburo of the Chinese Communist Party
Members of the 15th Politburo of the Chinese Communist Party
Members of the 16th Politburo Standing Committee of the Chinese Communist Party
Members of the 17th Politburo Standing Committee of the Chinese Communist Party
Members of the Secretariat of the Chinese Communist Party
People's Republic of China politicians from Anhui
Political office-holders in Shanghai
Politicians from Hefei
Tsinghua University alumni
Secretaries of the Communist Party Shanghai Committee